Renan Souza Diniz (born 27 February 1993) is a Brazilian footballer who plays for Mirassol.

References

1993 births
Living people
Brazilian footballers
Brazilian expatriate footballers
Adanaspor footballers
Süper Lig players
Esporte Clube Santo André players
América Futebol Clube (SP) players
Rio Claro Futebol Clube players
Oeste Futebol Clube players
Red Bull Brasil players
Clube Atlético Bragantino players
São Bernardo Futebol Clube players
Mirassol Futebol Clube players
Expatriate footballers in Turkey
Association football defenders
Footballers from São Paulo